Marpesia crethon, the Crethon daggerwing, is a species of butterfly of the family Nymphalidae. It is found in northern South America

References

Cyrestinae
Nymphalidae of South America
Butterflies described in 1776
Taxa named by Johan Christian Fabricius